Yuzhny (Russian: 'southern')(masculine), Yuzhnaya (feminine) or Yuzhnoye (neuter) may refer to:

Places
Yuzhny Okrug, name of several okrugs in Russia
Yuzhny, Russia (Yuzhnaya, Yuzhnoye), name of several inhabited localities in Russia
Yuzhny Island, an island in Russia
Yuzhny Airport (disambiguation), multiple airports
Yuzhnaya (Moscow Metro), a station of the Moscow Metro, Russia
Yuzhnoye Design Bureau, a Ukrainian design bureau of satellites and rockets
Iujnoe, a locality in Cahul District, Moldova
Yuzhne, a port city in Ukraine

People
Mikhail Youzhny (b. 1982), Russian tennis player